Jerónimo Bécker y González (2 December 1857 - 25 May 1925) was a Spanish historian, diplomat and journalist.

Bécker was born in Salamanca. He became a member of the Real Sociedad Geográfica de España in 1913, and was awarded the Knight Grand Cross of the Order of Isabella the Catholic in 1914. He died in Madrid, aged 67.

External links
 
 

1857 births
1925 deaths
20th-century Spanish historians
Spanish journalists
Knights Grand Cross of the Order of Isabella the Catholic
21st-century Spanish historians
People from Salamanca